Laura is an unincorporated community in Peoria County, Illinois, United States. Laura has a post office with ZIP code 61451.

History
Laura was platted in the late 1880s, and given the name of the daughter of a railroad official. A post office called Laura has been in operation since 1888.

References

Unincorporated communities in Peoria County, Illinois
Unincorporated communities in Illinois
Peoria metropolitan area, Illinois